The Doña Antonia Ramírez Residence (Spanish: Residencia Doña Antonia Ramírez), also known as the Hernández Residence (Residencia Hernández), is a historic Italianate-style residential building located in the Maguayo barrio of Dorado, Puerto Rico. The house was added to the United States National Register of Historic Places in 1988.

The lands where the house was built had been farmlands since at least 1896. The architectural plan, dated September 16, 1921, implies that the part of the house sporting an octagon was built by 1921, when the back part of the house was added.

References 

Houses on the National Register of Historic Places in Puerto Rico
Octagonal buildings
Italianate architecture
Houses completed in 1921
1921 establishments in Puerto Rico
National Register of Historic Places in Dorado, Puerto Rico